Lenka Kripac (born 19 March 1978) is an Australian singer-songwriter and actress best known for her song "The Show", from her debut album, Lenka. "The Show" has been used in numerous advertisements, most notably for Old Navy, as well as the Nickelodeon film Angus, Thongs and Perfect Snogging and the 2011 film Moneyball. Her song "Everything at Once" was used in a Windows 8 television advertisement and in a Disney Studio All Access commercial. Her fifth studio album, Attune, was released in 2017.

Early life
The daughter of Czech-born jazz trumpet musician, Jiří Křipač and Australian schoolteacher, Eden, Lenka was raised in the Australian coastal town of Bega until age seven, when her family moved to Sydney, where she received her schooling, acting and music training, and started to work as a highly regarded theatre actress and later musician.

Career

2008–2012: Beginnings and self-titled debut album
As a teenager, Lenka studied acting at the Australian Theatre for Young People, where she trained with actress Cate Blanchett. Lenka starred in the Australian ABC-TV drama series GP as Vesna Kapek in the 1990s. She also hosted Cheez TV and has guest starred in other Australian TV series, including Home and Away, Wildside, Head Start, and Spellbinder. She appeared in Australian feature films The Dish and Lost Things, as well as in theatre productions. Lenka provided the vocals for 2 tracks on Paul Mac's 2005 album Panic Room. As Lenka Kripac, she was a member of the Australian electronic-rock crossover band Decoder Ring for two of their albums.  She then moved to California in 2007.

After adopting her first name as her sole artistic name, Lenka released her eponymous debut album on 24 September 2008, with "The Show" (produced by Stuart Brawley) chosen to be the first single release from the set. The album peaked at number 142 on the US Billboard 200. Her song "Everything at Once" was featured in a Windows 8 ad, becoming a worldwide success. Lenka creates paper art type stop-motion animated music videos for each of her singles with her husband James Gulliver Hancock, a visual artist from Australia, for a deliberately childlike effect. She provided vocals on two tracks ("Addicted" and "Sunrise") on German artist Schiller's album Atemlos, released in Germany on 12 March 2010.

In 2011 she released her second album Two which was inspired by her engagement and is full of romantic love songs. Despite a warm critical reception, the album failed to match the success of her debut album, with Two reaching peak chart positions of 69 and 88 on the Belgian and Swiss charts respectively. Her third album Shadows appeared in 2013 after the birth of her son.

2015–present: Subsequent releases and Attune
Her fourth studio album The Bright Side was released in 2015 and the most featured single in this album became "Blue Skies". A remix version of the song, released on the YouTube remix channel Trap Nation, has over 30 million views on YouTube. Her latest album, Attune, was released in 2017 and contains the track Heal, which was created in cooperation with Australian singer and author Sally Seltmann. Her most played songs on BBC are "All My Bells Are Ringing", "We Will Not Grow Old", "Everything at Once", "Don't Let Me Fall", and "Trouble Is a Friend".

Personal life
Lenka currently resides in regional New South Wales, Australia. Lenka is married to visual artist James Gulliver Hancock. She announced on 27 September 2011 that she was pregnant. In March 2012, she announced on Twitter that she had given birth to a boy named Quinn. In 2016, she gave birth to her daughter, Etta.

Filmography

Discography

 Lenka (2008)
 Two (2011)
 Shadows (2013)
 The Bright Side (2015)
 Attune (2017)
 Recover (2020)
 Discover (2020)

References

External links

 
 Lenka talks to Flavorpill!
 Interview with Lenka
 Lenka In SPIN's November Issue 

1978 births
Living people
APRA Award winners
Australian singer-songwriters
Australian television actresses
Australian television personalities
Women television personalities
Australian people of Czech descent
Musicians from Sydney
Actresses from Sydney
Australian women pop singers
21st-century Australian singers
21st-century Australian women singers
Australian women singer-songwriters
Australian indie pop musicians